Shipton is an English surname. Notable people with the surname include:

Alyn Shipton (born 1953), American jazz musician 
Cathy Shipton (born 1957), English actress
Eric Shipton (1907–1977), English mountaineer
Geoff Shipton (born 1941), Australian swimmer
George Shipton (1839–1911), British trade unionist
James Shipton (1798–1865), British merchant and politician 
James Ancil Shipton (1867–1926), American army officer
Richard Shipton (died c.1726), pirate active in the Caribbean
Roger Shipton (1936–1998), Australian politician
Susan Shipton (born 1958), Canadian film editor 
William Shipton (1861–1941), English cricketer
Zoe Shipton, British geologist

See also
Ursula Southeil (c.1488–1561), English seer and prophetess known as Mother Shipton
Shipton (disambiguation)
Shipston (surname)

English-language surnames